Ken Goike (born August 13, 1955) is a member of the Michigan House of Representatives who represents north-east Macomb County. He was first elected to the state house of Representatives in 2010.

Sources
State House bio of Goike
Project Vote Smart bio of Goike

Republican Party members of the Michigan House of Representatives
People from Macomb County, Michigan
1955 births
Living people
21st-century American politicians